Marta del Castillo Casanueva (July 19, 1991 – January 24, 2009) was a Spanish high school student who disappeared and was presumably murdered on January 24, 2009. Despite extensive searches and the conviction of Miguel Carcaño Delgado in 2011, her body has never been found. The case is popularly known in Spain as the Disappearance of Marta del Castillo or simply as the Marta del Castillo Case.

Disappearance
Del Castillo was chatting with a friend, Silvia Fernández, through Messenger when she left the conversation with the line  ("Fatty, I leave you because [e]l Migue is downstairs and I'm going to talk to him. I'll call you later and tell you about it. Love you."). "El Migue" was the nickname of 19-year old Miguel Carcaño Delgado, a boy she had been casually seeing for approximately one month. Around 17:00, Del Castillo told her family that she would spend the evening with friends, and she left the family home in Seville's Argantonio Street. Del Castillo's mother had previously warned her about Carcaño, claiming that he had the "profile of a domestic abuser."

When Del Castillo was late getting home, her family called her cell phone, which was on for the first hours, but she didn't respond. They then called her friends, including some of the people who would be later accused of her disappearance, like Carcaño and Samuel Benítez. Carcaño admitted that he had seen her that evening, but claimed that he had left her near the entrance of her apartment block around 21:30. Del Castillo's mother was suspicious and told Carcaño that she'd "throw the police over" him if something bad had happened to her daughter. Carcaño attracted further suspicions from Del Castillo's family and friends when he moved immediately to nearby Camas, rather than joining the search for Del Castillo. Carcaño resided from then on in Camas with his latest girlfriend, 14-year old Rocío P. G., and her family. Among other places, Del Castillo's friends looked for her in the apartment where Carcaño had lived before with his older half-brother, Francisco Javier Delgado Moreno, in Seville's 78 León XIII Street, and they noticed that the place smelled strongly of bleach and ammonia. Del Castillo's family reported her disappearance to the police around 2:00 AM.

Investigation
The case was investigated by the Underage People Task Force of the Spanish National Police. After Carcaño's confession, it was joined by the Homicide Task Force. Carcaño denied his involvement in repeated interrogations, but P. G. claimed to have seen blood on Carcaño's pants, and the lining of Carcaño's jacket tested positive for Del Castillo's blood. A luminol test in León XIII also revealed a large bloodstain on the bedroom floor.

Carcaño's first version of the murder
Carcaño was interviewed again on February 14. Upon hearing of P. G.'s testimony and the existence of forensic evidence, he collapsed and confessed to the murder. According to this testimony, Carcaño murdered Del Castillo during an argument on the night of January 24. The reason for the argument was Carcaño's relationship with P. G. and Del Castillo's threat to tell P. G. about her own continued relationship with Carcaño if he didn't stop seeing her. The murder weapon was a heavy ashtray which was never found, but that Carcaño claimed to have used to hit Del Castillo on the left side of the parietal bone, killing her. Carcaño also claimed to have called a friend, Samuel Benítez Pérez, from a payphone in León XIII Street, and to have requested his help moving the body to Camas. Once there, they threw the body in the Guadalquivir River near a point called Charco de la Pava. Police suspected that Carcaño was not telling the whole truth. Among other things, he claimed that the vehicle used to move the body was his own moped, but tests showed that it was not stable enough to transport three people in that area, even without accounting for one of them being dead.

Arrests
On February 16, the Minister of the Interior Alfredo Pérez-Rubalcaba announced that Carcaño and Benítez were both arrested under charges of homicide and illegal detention. Also arrested were Carcaño's half-brother and a 15-year old friend of Carcaño and Benítez, later identified as Francisco Javier García Marín, alias "El Cuco".

Guadalquivir River search

Specialist Groups, and the Military Emergencies Unit searched the Guadalquivir between Camas and the stuary at Sanlúcar de Barrameda, using 22 vessels, 3 jet skis, 2 helicopters, 13 scent hounds, and a sonar and specialized underwater body retrieval technology lent by the Dutch Police. A Gelves dock engineer also designed, built and volunteered a rake-like tool capable of removing mud from the bottom of the river.

Three separate tests with pig carcasses weighing 50 kilograms were made. The bodies submerged several times, but in all three cases, they ended on the surface and stuck in a particular stretch of riverbank that was only 20 kilometers long. However, no trace of Del Castillo was found. Police worked with the hypothesis that the large volume of the Guadalquivir in January and the three weeks between the murder and Carcaño's confession had been enough to either wash the body out to sea before the search began or to entomb it in the bottom mud, which can be two meters thick in some areas.

Also searched were over 40 wells, canals, sewage plants, and pipes. A "bloodstained cloth" found in an irrigation canal near Camas was revealed to be just painted red after testing.

"El Cuco"'s version
In his own testimony (later recanted), "El Cuco" stated that he arrived in León XIII with Benítez, where they found Carcaño wrapping Del Castillo's body in a blanket under the supervision of Delgado. Delgado then threatened him and his family to silence him and stayed at the apartment to clean the evidence while the other three disposed of the body. Police believed that Delgado planned the strategy to follow after the murder, based on this testimony and phone conversations between Carcaño and Delgado while both were in remand. In one conversation, Delgado told Carcaño to "say nothing, because the police has nothing."

Carcaño's second version
On March 18, during the customary reconstruction of the crime at Leon XIII, Carcaño surprised the police when he requested to recant his previous testimony and make a new one. In this second statement, Carcaño blamed the murder on "El Cuco", saying that he had strangled Del Castillo in Delgado's living room while Carcaño was in the bedroom under the influence of "substances". Afterward, he phoned Benítez and they disposed of the body in a dumpster in the cross between León XIII and Jorge de Montemayor streets.

Carcaño claimed that he had felt pressured by the police to make his first testimony. Following this second testimony, the other three accused were requested to make new statements of their own, and they were confronted with Carcaño and each other to study their reaction. Benítez and "El Cuco" claimed to not be involved at all, and to not have visited Delgado's apartment on the day of the crime. "El Cuco"'s lawyer called Carcaño's second statement a joke and remarked the innocence of his client. Also critical was Del Castillo's father Antonio, who accused the suspects of being deliberately misleading about the body's location because they were hiding additional crimes against his daughter. Del Castillo speculated that his daughter had been cremated in an incinerator where P. G.'s father had been employed in previously.

Because of Carcaño's new statement, the search team was alerted and directed from the river to the Montemarta-Cónica landfill near Alcalá de Guadaíra, where the trash generated in Seville is processed.

Carcaño's third version
On March 19, confronted with the "unbelievability" of the crime reconstruction in León XIII, Carcaño requested to recant and make yet another statement before the examining magistrate. This time, Carcaño said that he had been drinking, smoking and taking drugs with Del Castillo and "El Cuco" at León XIII. Around midnight, the two males attempted to have sex with Del Castillo, and when she resisted, they beat her and took her to the bedroom, where they threatened her with a knife and Carcaño raped her, followed by "El Cuco". Afterward, they tied her to the bed with insulating tape and the cord from a heart monitor. Carcaño punched her hard enough to make her bleed, and they strangled her together. The body was disguised with two trash bags, moved out of the apartment on a wheelchair previously used by Carcaño's dead mother, and thrown in the dumpster while "El Cuco" disposed of the knife on a sewer. Though authorities were not entirely convinced by this version, it explained the finding of the knife in the sewer in front of the apartment, the presence of Del Castillo's blood and DNA of both Carcaño and "El Cuco" in the bedroom, the finding of cells belonging to both Carcaño and Del Castillo in the wheelchair's handlers, and the testimony of a neighbor who had met Carcaño when he returned to the building with the empty wheelchair.

Witnesses to the statement claimed that Carcaño had looked the magistrate in the eye for the first time and appeared to have taken a load off his mind after he was finished. Carcaño's lawyer renounced to continue representing him after this point. When asked about why he had implicated Benítez and said that he had disposed of the body in the river, he claimed that he had told the police what they wanted to hear. He also denied any involvement from his half-brother, who he claimed had left the apartment at 20:30, ten minutes after Carcaño arrived there with Del Castillo. Carcaño also denied having talked about the murder with P. G., in contradiction with her own testimony, which stated that he had told her "everything." It was estimated that in the time between the disappearance and Carcaño's new version, around 65,000 tons of trash had arrived at the landfill. As a result, it would be "very difficult" to locate the body. Landfill employees and policemen revised 60,000 tons over the course of 32 days unsuccessfully, even though they knew a particular area where the trash was dumped in the days following the murder. They also found no human DNA in the dumpsters that Carcaño had said were used to dispose of the body. Eventually, Police concluded that Carcaño had not thrown the body in a dumpster, and speculated that he had falsely confessed a rape with the intention of obtaining a bench trial rather than a trial by jury.

Provisional release of Delgado, Benítez and "El Cuco"
On May 21, Delgado was released with the condition that he visited the courthouse every Monday. Reasons included the fact that Delgado's part in the crime was necessarily small if any, and that his alibi had been partly confirmed by mobile phone tracking placing him on the road to Carmona at 21:01. Delgado, who had always denied his involvement, offered to take a polygraph test, but the magistrate rejected the idea. After his release, Delgado made a press statement accusing his half-brother of lying to him, and about his involvement in the case.

Benítez was released on December 10. He had requested to be released on two previous occasions, but he was denied arguing gravity of the suspected crime and a risk of tampering with evidence after release. "El Cuco", being under 18 years of age, was placed in a juvenile detention center for the maximum legal time (9 months), and moved to a supervised home afterward.

Evidence in vehicles owned by the family of "El Cuco"

"El Cuco" first claimed that the trio used his mother's Volkswagen Polo to move the body from León XIII to the Guadalquivir. This car was washed a few days after Del Castillo's disappearance, but it tested positive for blood in luminol and benzidine tests. However, no DNA could be extracted from the blood as it was too degraded. Police also found the DNA of a man and a woman in the car, which belonged to neither the victim nor the suspects. It was assumed to belong to "El Cuco"'s mother and her boyfriend, but neither agreed to provide a DNA sample for comparison.

In December, it was discovered that a Renault 19 and a Ford Escort abandoned since August on Seville's streets, with flat tires and no license plates, also belonged to "El Cuco"'s mother and her boyfriend, contradicting their claims that they only owned the Polo. The Renault was retired and destroyed on November 27, before the discovery was made, but the Ford could be retrieved for testing. DNA of a man and a woman that was neither Del Castillo nor any of the accused was found in the Ford. The female DNA belonged to the same woman as the DNA in the Polo.

Trials

Pre-trial hearing
A pre-trial hearing was held on March 13, 2010. Rocío P. G., who faced no charges, was declared for an hour and a half. She said that Carcaño had told her that he had thrown Del Castillo's body in a wooded area near Camas. Previously, she had claimed that he had buried it in a ditch some 600 meters from this new location, which led to two unsuccessful searches there earlier in had not been at her home in the night of the crime, as he had claimed, but that he had left his cell phone there, explaining why mobile phone tracking data placed him there at the time. When questioned about a threatening call that she had received during the investigation, she denied that she had identified Francisco Javier Delgado as the maker of the call, and remarked that she had merely picked his voice among several anonymous recordings played to her by police. Journalists speculated that this clarification was a result of P. G. feeling intimidated after Delgado sued her for perjury in the week leading to the hearing. Nevertheless, P. G. cast doubt on her own reliability as a witness when she nonchalantly claimed to have lied to police and flaunted that "If I lie to Police, I [can] lie to anyone," in a statement found baffling by the present. P. G.'s mother and grandmother also testified in regard to their three-week cohabitation with Carcaño in the family home. At the end of her declaration, P. G. walked pass Carcaño and suffered a panic attack.

Carcaño declined to make a new statement. The judge only questioned him once, in regards to the location of Del Castillo's body. Carcaño lowered his head and said, "I don't know." The last person to testify was the mother of "El Cuco", who said that her son had no access to her car because she kept the only existing key.

Ordinary court trial
The first trial, presided by Judge Francisco de Asís Molina, began on April 12, 2010. Miguel Carcaño was charged with two instances of rape, one of murder, one of the crimes against moral integrity and one of corpse desecration. Francisco Javier Delgado, his girlfriend María García Mendaro, and Samuel Benítez each faced a charge of concealment of a crime, corpse desecration and crimes against moral integrity, with Delgado receiving an additional charge for making threats. The prosecution's version of the crime largely followed Carcaño's third version of the murder, with the differing claim that Delgado and García made it to the apartment after Benítez and were involved in the disposal of the body. It also mentioned "El Cuco" as one of the main perpetrators, who was to be tried separately in juvenile court. The prosecution requested a sentence of 52 years in prison for Carcaño, eight for Delgado, and five for Benítez. It also requested all four adults to pay the expenses of the unsuccessful search for the body and to compensate Del Castillo's parents with 160,000 euro and each of her sisters with 30,000 euro. In addition, Benítez should stay away from Del Castillo's family and not contact them for six years after his incarceration.

On February 1, 2011, Carcaño testified before Court, stating this time that Del Castillo wasn't raped, he killed her alone with the ashtray and stayed in León XIII to clean up the crime scene while Benítez and "El Cuco" disposed of the body in the river. On October 18, Carcaño added that he had falsely accused "El Cuco" of rape and murder in vengeance for "El Cuco" implicating Delgado in the murder and that Benítez and "El Cuco" did not arrive until after the murder had already happened. Delgado claimed that he left the house without ever meeting Del Castillo or knowing that she was in a relationship with his brother; that Carcaño's bedroom door was closed when he left and he didn't look inside; and that he was with his ex-wife and daughter between 21:00 and 23:30, in his pub until 2:00, and in a bar until 4:00 when he called García to let him in the apartment. He denied to have threatened anyone or to know where the body was, but he refused to explain what he meant when he was heard saying "There is nothing to look for" in the aftermath of Del Castillo's disappearance. García testified that she asked Delgado's permission to study in his home and that she went there after driving Delgado to his pub around 23:50. She claimed to have never seen Del Castillo or her body, but that she smelled something strange behind Carcaño's door, which was closed. She then retracted this last statement. She denied accusations that her testimony was intended to fabricate an alibi for Delgado. Benítez testified that he never was at León XIII and had no involvement in the crime, attributing his original confession to have helped dispose of the body to police pressure.

"El Cuco", already convicted in his own trial, testified as a witness on the ordinary trial on October 26. He claimed to not know where the body was and that his early confessions of helping in the disposal of the body were lies made due to police pressure and their threat to implicate his mother and other relatives. On November 3, Rocío P. G. testified that Carcaño had told her about how he and Delgado had murdered Del Castillo during an argument, cleaned the murder scene, disposed of the body with "two others" in the wooden area near Camas, and entered her home through a window in the early morning. He also took her to the wooden area, but she wasn't sure if he was telling the truth. She explained inconsistencies in her previous versions with the claim that she had been threatened. P. G.'s mother testified that Carcaño had murdered Del Castillo but had no part in the body disposal, and explained her daughter's inconsistencies due to being both afraid and in love with Carcaño. The early witness statement by P. G.'s grandmother, who had died before the trial proper started, was read again. It stated that she had washed Carcaño's clothes in the morning and found nothing strange in them. Antonio T. D., a barman in León XIII, testified that he saw two thin individuals in hoodies pushing a wheelchair with a large package to the dumpsters, around 2:00 AM, and then returning with the wheelchair empty. Delgado's ex-wife testified that he was with her and their daughter between 21:15 and 23:30.

On November 14, a taxi driver testified as a surprise witness for the prosecution, claiming he drove Delgado to León XIII "in the first hours of the morning", thus contradicting the testimonies of Delgado and García. When asked why he didn't come forward until the week before, he said that he didn't realize the value of his testimony before then. "El Cuco"'s father testified that he sent home his son early and that while he did not check if he was there, as he was at work, his wife did. "El Cuco"'s mother said that she arrived home at 1:30 AM and saw her son asleep in his room. Her testimony was polemic because she had repeatedly requested to delay or cancel it claiming illness, yet she had been interviewed the week before in Telecinco's prime-time talk show La Noria and paid for it. In response, Telecinco was subjected to a boycott by viewers and all sponsors pulled out of the show, leading to the relegation of the program to the early morning and its eventual cancelation.

On January 16, 2012, Carcaño was sentenced to 20 years in prison and to compensate Del Castillo's parents and sisters with 340,000 Euros for the murder; he was acquitted of every other charge. All other accused were acquitted of all charges due to lack of evidence. The sentence stated that Carcaño had disposed of the body with the help of "El Cuco" (convicted in his own trial) and a third, unknown person, but the evidence identifying such person as Benítez was deemed insufficient.

Juvenile court trial
"El Cuco"'s trial began on January 24, 2011. The presiding judge was Alejandro Vián. "El Cuco" stood charges for rape, murder and a crime against moral integrity due to his prevention of Del Castillo's receiving a funeral; he plied innocence and claimed to not know the location of the body, blaming his four previous confessions to have concealed the murder on Police's pressures. Carcaño, Delgado, Benítez, and García were called to testify as witnesses, while "El Cuco"'s father declined to testify. The prosecution requested six years of internment in a juvenile detention center, three under supervised freedom, and a 616,319 euro fine, the cost of the unsuccessful search for Del Castillo's body.

On March 24, 2011, "El Cuco" was found guilty of the charge of concealment and was sentenced to three years in a juvenile detention center and one month of supervised freedom. The verdict allowed "El Cuco"'s past internment to be counted as part of his sentence, meaning that he would be released less than a year after the trial. He was found innocent of the charges of rape and murder, and not liable to pay for the expenses incurred during the unsuccessful search for the body. The verdict caused controversy because it relied on the identity of Carcaño as the main perpetrator, even though this wasn't proven yet since Carcaño's own trial had not finished.

Supreme Court ruling
Citing contradictions and "illogical" assumptions on the Ordinary Court ruling, the prosecution requested that the sentence be overturned by the Supreme Court of Spain and a new trial take place. This was rejected by the Supreme Court and the verdicts were upheld, but Carcaño's sentence was changed after considering that his ever-changing statements about the murder and fate of the body went beyond his right to not testify and incriminate himself. These had caused unnecessary, additional grief to the relatives of Del Castillo and constituted a crime against moral integrity. As a result, Carcaño was given an additional one-year and three months in prison, and he was also fined with the cost of the unsuccessful searches estimated on 616,319.27 Euros.

Aftermath

Continued searches
In 2013, Carcaño told Police that Delgado was the real, and only murderer of Del Castillo. According to this new version (the sixth), Delgado pistol-whipped Del Castillo with his security guard's firearm after she tried to intervene in a fight between the brothers, and they subsequently buried the body together in a farm of La Rinconada called "La Majaloba", returning 24 hours later to cover the remains with lime. When asked why he had not said any of that earlier, Carcaño replied that he was afraid of his brother. The prosecution considered the story unbelievable and journalists noted obvious parallels with the killing of Lasa and Zabala by the paramilitary group GAL. Following Delgado's new interrogation, the judge cleared him and criticized the Police for questioning Carcaño for a crime he was already convicted of. Despite general scepticism, La Majaloba was searched months later and no trace of a body was found.

In 2014, search operations were made in an illegal dumpsite located near the road used by Carcaño to move between Seville and Camas, and not far from the river shore where he claimed to have thrown the body in his first version. The new location was deemed promising according to the results of a P300 study Carcaño was subjected to in Zaragoza's university hospital. While human bone fragments were recovered at the site, they belonged to three or more people who had died between 100 and 200 years before. Carcaño reiterated his last version before Court, insisting that the body was in La Majaloba, not the dump, and saying that he didn't understand why the Police were searching there.

In 2015, Antonio del Castillo offered Carcaño 18,000 euro if he pinpointed the exact location of the body, with the promise that he would not seek additional charges against him and that he could spend it in Seville or wherever he wished, after his incarceration. Carcaño rejected the offer, saying that it wouldn't "make up for him."

"Óscar"'s claims
On September 7, 2015 Antena 3's Espejo Público interviewed a man with the pseudonym "Óscar", who claimed to be a police consultant infiltrated for the past two and a half years in the circle of "El Cuco", and who had 600 hours of conversations with them on tape. The interviewee claimed that when Carcaño and "El Cuco" transported the body on the wheelchair, they did not bring it to the dumpster or the river, as they had claimed, but to another apartment where it was dismembered with the help of a friend of Carcaño who wasn't Spanish. It was then taken out in different bags, whose fate was ignored by Carcaño, thus explaining his incapability to locate the body exactly. The same source claimed that "El Cuco"'s family felt "no sadness nor empathy" for Del Castillo's family, that they laughed about the unsuccessful search for the body, and that they had considered having someone beat up Del Castillo's mother and grandfather.

On October 29, the examining magistrate accepted the tapes as potential evidence. Some seconds were played in Espejo Público, revealing that "El Cuco"'s mother had helped create an alibi for her son, and that she was worried about the possibility that he had raped Del Castillo and that "El Cuco"'s father might compromise his case by talking too much. "Óscar" also said that "El Cuco"'s mother "may have" helped in the disposal of the body by lending her vehicle, that "El Cuco" was silent because he wanted to protect his mother, and that he had proof of Delgado's involvement in the murder. In January 2016, "Óscar" was publicly identified by Police as Pablo Bonilla R., a common criminal and one of many people who had tried to infiltrate themselves into the high-profile case. It was denied that he ever worked for Police in any capacity, and the tapes were dismissed as a hoax. These revelations were made during a trial against both the parents of "El Cuco" and Bonilla himself for breaking the restraining order that forbid "El Cuco" from getting within 50 kilometers of Seville. Bonilla, charged for driving the car used by "El Cuco" and his family to travel to Seville, claimed that he had alerted Police about the family's intentions, and that Police had told him to drive them into the road control where they were arrested. Bonilla's claims were dismissed and all three accused were sentenced to pay small fines.

On March 16, 2016, the Del Castillo family sued "El Cuco" and his parents for false testimony at the ordinary court trial, which happened when "El Cuco" was already of age and legally liable. As their evidence, they cited other witness testimonies, the dismissed tapes, and TV statements of the parents claiming that they lied to create an alibi for their son. "El Cuco"'s family rejected the tapes both as a forgery and illegally taken, and refused to testify in the new trial.

2017 Guadalquivir search
Judge Molina ordered a new search in a section of the Guadalquivir on February 7, 2017, after receiving a report commissioned by Antonio del Castillo. The area, placed a 10-minute walk away from León XIII, and near the Cartuja rowing and kayak center, was identified as the likely location of the body disposal by criminologist Ignacio Abad and geophysicist Luis Avial, who used a georadar to locate 16 "exogen" points on the river bed susceptible of being the body. The area was consistent with the testimony of a nurse in the Virgen Macarena University Hospital, who claimed to have seen three men in black hoodies pushing a wheelchair. When they stopped, the "very little one" was approached by a couple who talked to him. The search ended on February 24 after finding unrelated objects only.

The same day, Antonio del Castillo met Carcaño in Herrera de la Mancha prison. Carcaño claimed that he didn't know the location of Del Castillo's daughter and that it was his brother who disposed of the body. This time, he claimed that Delgado transported the body in his ex-wife's car and that he buried it in a farm of La Algaba. He added that Delgado had probably dug it up later and reburied it elsewhere. Carcaño also claimed that he was threatened by Delgado into accompanying him to dispose of the body, but that he barely collaborated and fled as soon as he could. As for his ever-changing versions of the murder, he claimed that he always followed the advice of his brother.

See also
 List of solved missing persons cases
 Murder of Eva Blanco
 Murder of Rocío Wanninkhof
 Murder of Rosana Maroto
 Ramón Laso

References

External links
 The Marta del Castillo case in Criminalia

1991 births
Deaths by person in Spain
Incidents of violence against women
January 2009 events in Europe
Missing person cases in Spain
Murder convictions without a body
Murder trials
Seville
Spanish murder victims
Trials in Spain
Violence against women in Spain
2009 murders in Spain
2009 deaths